The Family Movement, also known in the past as the Parent Movement, is an arm of the disability rights movement, a larger social movement.  The Family Movement advocates for the economic and social rights of family members with a disability.  Key elements include: social inclusion; active participation; a life of meaning; safety; economic security; accessibility and self-determination.  The family movement has been critical in closing institutions and other segregated facilities; promoting inclusive education; reforming adult guardianship to the current supported decisionmaking; increasing access to health care; developing real jobs; fighting stereotypes and reducing discrimination.

The Parent/Family Arm of the Disability Movement
In the late 1940s and early 1950s families spontaneously across Canada, the US, England, France, Scandinavia, Australia and New Zealand began asserting a different vision, a different lifestyle and a different future for their sons and daughters with intellectual disabilities, mental handicaps and developmental disabilities.  These isolated, independent developments eventually coalesced into the first wave of the 'parent movement'.  They organized and demanded services for their sons and daughters. Their efforts eventually resulted in the UN Declaration on the Rights of Disabled Persons, December 9, 1975. (Note: while this terminology is not used today it was the commonly accepted terminology 6 or 7 decades ago.)  This has subsequently been eclipsed by the UN Convention on the Rights of Persons with Disabilities which was equally influenced by the emerging and now very strong consumer 'independent living' arm of the disability movement.

In those early formative days families around the world began to question the accepted wisdom that they should institutionalize their son or daughter with a disability.  But parents were isolated from each other. They had no way of knowing who else felt the same way. It was not easy for parents to get to know each other. Some resorted to placing ads in newspapers. Even here they faced challenges as some newspapers felt it was inappropriate to advertise the fact you had a child with a disability.  It is hard to understand today but this was the accepted wisdom of the time.

As they started coming together families began to create opportunities, programs and supports for their sons and daughters. They created programs with few resources. Taking over church basements to set up schools; borrowing chalk, discarded books from school boards who would not accept educational responsibility for educating their sons and daughters.

These parents and their community supporters formed the Associations for Retarded Children.  These organizations are now called Associations for Community Living in Canada. Following their example organizations for people with cerebral palsy (concurrent time period of the Arc), hearing and visual impairments, autism and other handicapping conditions were started. Parents were also involved as parent-professional partners at university centers, and were given additional funds to begin cross-disability offices, and even family support agencies with preferential hiring practices.

Three famous Americans (two parents and one brother) had a major impact on public perceptions of disability in the 1950s and 1960s. One was Nobel Prize winner Pearl Buck who wrote about her daughter Carol in the book The Child Who Never Grew.  The other was Dale Evans who starred with her husband Roy Rogers in a popular television western wrote Angel Unaware about her daughter with Down Syndrome. The third was President John F. Kennedy, whose sister Rosemary had a mental handicap. In 1961 he launched the President's Panel on Mental Retardation which became the President's Committee on Mental Retardation. These three combined with the work of parents and family members brought the issue out of the closet, eased the stigma of having a child with a disability and became a major source of hope for families.

In 1961 the International League of Societies for the Mentally Handicapped was formed. This organization is now called Inclusion International.

The UN Declaration on the Rights of Disabled Persons was adopted by the United Nations General Assembly on December 9, 1975.

One of the most important contributions to the parent/family movement was the introduction of the concept of Normalization (people with disabilities).  Originating in Denmark with Erik Bank-Mikkelsen and Bengt Nirjeit normalization principles were adapted in North America by Wolf Wolfensberger. Dr. Wolfensberger fully supported families, and to some extent, parental control in decisionmaking. Wolfensberger wrote his seminal work in Toronto in the early 1970s as a visiting scholar to the Canadian Association for the Mentally Retarded and the National Institute on Mental Retardation – the national bodies for the local parent founded organizations.  Wolfensberger's theory is now called Social Role Valorisation.

Eventually with persistence, patience and ingenuity the government funded system of social, educational and health programs and services took shape.

By the 1980s the parent/family movement had successfully established a comprehensive program and service infrastructure which was court-mandated in some states and developed through major state and regional governmental offices. It was natural for them to support their sons and daughters who were creating their own movements, including the Independent Living movement which had strong roots in the 1970s laws (e.g., Rehabilitation Act of 1973) and self-advocacy movement which obtained university parent-professional support in its inception.

Regional impacts

British Columbia, Canada
 Closure of all 3 major institutions
 Tranquille Institution in Tranquille, Kamloops, British Columbia
 Glendale Institution
 Woodlands Institution
 Closure of all segregated schools
 Creation of innovative organizations
 BC Association for Community Living (BCACL)
 Family Support Institute
 Vela Microboard Association
 Planned Lifetime Advocacy Network (PLAN)
 Community Living Society
 BC Self Advocacy Foundation 
 Vancouver Adaptive Snow Sports
 Tetra Society of North America
 Kickstart Society for Disability Arts and Culture
 Can Assist
 Communitas Supportive Care Society
 BC Initiative for Inclusive Post-Secondary Education (STEPS Forward)
 Creating a unique alternative to legal guardianship
 which includes establishing a test of legal capacity that recognizes caring trusting relationships
Pioneering individualized funding and service brokerage

New York, United States
 Closure of major institutions
 Willowbrook State School, Staten Island New York (Video)
 Creation of innovative organizations
 AHRC New York City

Timeline

British Columbia
 1952 – establishment of Vancouver Association for Retarded Children
 1955 – establishment of BC Association for Retarded Children by seven local parent associations. Now called the BC Association for Community Living.
 1958 – Canadian Association for Retarded Children founded (now Canadian Association for Community Living –CACL)
 1981 – International Year of Disabled Persons
 1982 – Stephen Dawson Supreme Court case establishes right of children with disabilities to receive medical care
 1984 – Tranquille blockade
 1985 – closure of Tranquille Institution
 1986 – Family Support Institute founded
 1987 – Closure of world's largest state-supported institution: Willowbrook State School, Staten Island New York
 1988 – First Federal Election recognizing the rights of people with developmental disabilities to vote
 1988 – Establishment of BC Self Advocacy Foundation
 1989 – Establishment of Planned Lifetime Advocacy Network (PLAN)
 1992 – Barb Goode first self advocate to address the United Nations General assembly
 1993 – new Adult Guardianship legislation
 1996 – closure of Glendale Institution
 1996 – closure of Woodlands Institution
 2000 – establishment of Representation Agreement Act – first statute in the world to accept caring trusting relationships as a criterion for determining legal capability
 2004 – Establishment of CLBC – Crown Corporation

New York City

The AHRC New York City was founded in 1949.

References

 Citations – books

 
 

 Journals

 
 
 

 Web pages

External links
 The Family Support Institute of British Columbia
 Vela Microboard Association
 Planned Lifetime Advocacy Network
 Community Living Society of British Columbia
 The British Columbia Association for Community Living
 Vancouver Adaptive Snow Sports
 Tetra Society of North America
 CanAssist University of Victoria
 Communitas Supportive Care Society

Disability rights organizations
Developmental disabilities
History of disability